Piotr Konstantinovich Vasiliev (January 26, 1909 – June 9, 1989) was a Russian Soviet realist painter, who lived and worked in Leningrad. He was a member of the Leningrad Union of Artists and regarded as one of representatives of the Leningrad school of painting.

Biography 
Piotr Konstantinovich Vasiliev was born January 26, 1909, in Saint Petersburg, Russian Empire in the working-class family.

In 1930, Piotr Vasiliev entered at the first course of Department of Painting at the Leningrad Institute of Painting, Sculpture and Architecture, where he studied of noted educators Mikhail Bernshtein, Alexander Lubimov, Vladimir Serov, Arcady Rylov.

In 1938 Piotr Vasiliev graduated from the Leningrad Institute of Painting, Sculpture and Architecture in Isaak Brodsky studio, together with Alexander Laktionov, Yuri Neprintsev, and other young artists. His graduated work was historical painting named "Farewell member of the Komsomol at the front. 1919.", dedicated to the events of the Civil War in Russia in 1918-1921.

After graduation, Piotr Vasiliev was sent to work for an art teacher in Chuvashia. After returning to Leningrad in the years 1939-1941 he taught painting in the Tavricheskaya Art School.

In June 1941, Piotr Vasiliev was drafted into the Red Army and took part in the Great Patriotic War of the Soviet people against Nazi Germany and its allies. He fought on the Leningrad Front, Karelian Front, and 3rd Ukrainian Front. He was wounded and marked by military awards.

In 1944-1945, Piotr Vasiliev took part in the liberation of the Nazi occupation of Poland, Romania, Hungary, Czechoslovakia, and Austria.

Piotr Vasiliev has participated in art exhibitions since 1938. He painted portraits, landscapes, still lifes, genre and historical paintings. In 1946 Piotr Vasiliev was admitted to the Leningrad Union of Soviet Artists (since 1992 known as the Saint Petersburg Union of Artists).

His picturesque style is typical for students of Isaac Brodsky, and based on the constructive role of drawing, on classically constructed composition and delicate tonal relations, on transfer of lighting and shadow contrasts. The artist used mainly broad painting and a rich palette of colors.

Piotr Konstantinovich Vasiliev died on June 9, 1989, in Leningrad at the eighty-first year of life. His paintings reside in art museums and private collections in Russia, England, in the U.S., Japan, France, and others.

Honours and awards
Order of the Red Star
Medal "For the Defence of Leningrad"
Medal "For the Victory over Germany in the Great Patriotic War 1941–1945"
Medal "For the Capture of Budapest"
Medal "For the Capture of Vienna"

See also
 Leningrad School of Painting
 List of Russian artists
 List of 20th-century Russian painters
 List of painters of Saint Petersburg Union of Artists
 Saint Petersburg Union of Artists

References

Sources 
 Artists of the peoples of the USSR. Biography Dictionary. Volume 2. - Moscow: Iskusstvo Edition, 1972. - p. 190.
 Peinture Russe. Catalogue. - Paris: Drouot Richelieu, 26 Avril, 1991. - p. 7,25.
 Sergei V. Ivanov. Unknown Socialist Realism. The Leningrad School. - Saint Petersburg: NP-Print Edition, 2007. – pp. 15, 18, 28, 29, 78, 79, 358, 384, 390, 394, 396, 402, 404, 405, 411, 414, 416, 421, 422. , .
 Anniversary Directory graduates of Saint Petersburg State Academic Institute of Painting, Sculpture, and Architecture named after Ilya Repin, Russian Academy of Arts. 1915 - 2005. - Saint Petersburg: Pervotsvet Publishing House, 2007. p. 62.

1909 births
1989 deaths
Painters from Saint Petersburg
People from Sankt-Peterburgsky Uyezd
20th-century Russian painters
Russian male painters
Soviet painters
Socialist realism
Socialist realist artists
Soviet military personnel of World War II
Leningrad School artists
Repin Institute of Arts alumni
Members of the Leningrad Union of Artists
20th-century Russian male artists